Wat Chang Kham ("Elephant-Propped Temple"), formerly known as Wat Kan Thom ("Kan Thom's Temple") after the name of its builder, is a ruined temple that is part of the Wiang Kum Kam archaeological area, outside of Chiang Mai in northern Thailand. The present name of the temple is derived from elephant figures supporting one of the structures.

The modern site is within the grounds of a working temple and is adjacent to Wat That Noi, one of the smallest sites in the Wiang Kum Kam archaeological group.

References

 Oliver Hargreave: Exploring Chiang Mai, City, Valley & Mountains. Within Books, 4th Edition, 2013. 

Chang Kham
History of Chiang Mai